Liuzi Temple is a monument built to honor Liu Zongyuan, a Chinese writer and poet who had lived here for 10 years during the Tang dynasty (618–907).

History
Located in Liuzi Street of Yongzhou, Hunan, beside Yu Stream, Liuzi Temple is a Confucian temple with a history of nearly a thousand years and was first built as Liu Zihou Ancestral Temple in the 3rd Year of Period Zhihe, namely AD 1056, in the reign of Emperor Renzong in the Northern Song dynasty (960–1127).

Liuzi Temple was reconstruction in the 14th Year of Period Shixing (1144) in the Southern Song dynasty (1127-1279).

In the Ming dynasty (1368–1644), Liuzi Temple was twice repaired in the 8th Year of Zhengde Emperor of (1513) and the 25th Year of Jiajing Emperor (1546) respectively.

Liuzi Temple was lately repaired on a large scale in the 3rd Year of Guangxu Emperor (1877) of Qing dynasty (1644–1911). 

In 1957, it has been designated as a provincial level key cultural heritage. In 1963, Tao Zhu, secretary of Bureau of the Central Southern China of the Communist Party of China, visited the temple and gave an instruction to protect the temple. He said: "(We) should strengthen attention and protection of the Liuzi Temple, (we) need to raise funds to restored the Liuzi Temple as soon as possible". On June 25, 2001, it has been listed among the fifth group of "State Cultural Protection Relics Units" by the State Council of China.

Architecture

Liuzi Temple has three halls: the main hall (the front hall), the middle hall and the back hall.

Gate and stage
The gate built in a row with a big one in the middle and two small ones on two sides, just like the shanmen in Han Chinese Buddhist Temples. On both sides of the main entrance there are two Chinese guardian lions. A couplet hanging on the two sides of the doorway, it reads "" in Chinese. The couplet was written by magistrate of Yongzhou Yang Han in the Period of Tongzhi Emperor of Qing Dynasty. A double eaves and eight columns stage behind the main hall, which used for worshiping Liu Zongyuan. The stage was renovated in 1957. A plaque which was written by He Shaoji on the stage. It reads "" (means "green landscape") in Chinese.

Cultural relics
Liuzi Temple has many Steles, such as Lizi Stele, Song of Catching Snakes, and Looking for Yu Stream and Visiting Liuzi Temple.

Lizi Stele
The Lizi Stele, also known as Sanjue Stele (Sanjue, means "three wonders"). Its article content was written by Han Yu and was in Su Shi's handwriting. The Lizi Stele originally collected in Liuhou Ancestral Temple, Liuzhou. Liu Keqin, a local official copied by carving and later was destroyed during wars. The modern stele was carved in the 7th Year of Tongzhi Emperor (1868) of Qing Dynasty.

References

External links

Buildings and structures in Yongzhou
Tourist attractions in Yongzhou
Major National Historical and Cultural Sites in Hunan